Brendan Loughnane (born December 5, 1989) is a British professional mixed martial artist. He competes in the Featherweight division of the Professional Fighters League (PFL). Loughnane has been a professional competitor since 2010, and competed in the Ultimate Fighting Championship (UFC), Absolute Championship Akhmat (ACB) and BAMMA.

Background 
Born in Manchester, England and growing up in Withington, Brendan attended The Barlow RC High School in Didsbury as an energetic, athletic, and football-loving teenager. Loughnane grew up around sports, having played football at a junior level for Stockport County F.C.. He also lived close to Jesse Lingard and would occasionally go to his house to play football.One of his neighbors introduced him to mixed martial arts (MMA) and took him to the gym for training. Brendan quickly fell in love with the sport and, after only three months of training, he had his first amateur fight at the age of 18. He was thrilled to earn £150 for the fight and celebrated with his friends at a local casino. Brendan went on to win his first five amateur fights before turning professional in 2010. Although he had recently completed a BTEC in mechanical engineering at North Trafford College, he decided to pursue a career in MMA. In order to train, Brendan used a football cage at Platt Fields Park in Fallowfield as a makeshift gym, which attracted the attention of those passing by.

Mixed martial arts career

Early career
Loughnane made his amateur debut in 2008 were he went 5-0 with 4 first round finishes, before making his professional debut in June 2010 at X-Treme Kombat with a second round knockout win over Jordan Desborough. He then amassed a record of 6-0 in various regional promotions before going on The Ultimate Fighter.

The Ultimate Fighter: The Smashes
Loughnane appeared on The Ultimate Fighter: The Smashes in 2012 joining Team UK in the lightweight bracket after replacing Michael Pastou who suffered an injury in episode two which left him unable to compete. Loughnane started the tournament of well with a unanimous decision victory over Patrick Iodice. However he would later lose to Norman Parke via unanimous decision in episode ten.

Loughnane lost to Mike Wilkinson by unanimous decision on 15 December 2012 at UFC on FX: Sotiropoulos vs. Pearson ultimately missing out on the opportunity to win a UFC contract.

Post TUF Smashes
In 2013 Loughnane joined Full Contact Contender (FCC) where he became the FCC Lightweight Champion after defeating Jason Cooledge via unanimous decision shortly later. He defended the title once with a win over Ali Maclean. 

In 2014 Loughnane signed with BAMMA were he competed at Featherweight. After going 2-0 in the promotion Loughnane faced Tom Duquesnoy for the BAMMA Featherweight Championship were he lost via a controversial split decision

He returned in 2016 and reclaimed the FCC Lightweight title with a knockout win over David Lee, making him a two-time champion and would go on to collect two stoppage victories under the Tanko FC banner against Eden Newton and Paul Cook.

Loughnane signed with Absolute Championship Akhmat and made his debut  on 11 March 2017 at ACB 53 with a knockout win over Mike Wilkinson whom he had previously lost to on his UFC debut. This fight earned him Knockout of the Night.

Loughnane faced Pat Healy on July 22, 2017, at ACB 65: Silva vs. Agnaev. He lost the back-and-forth fight via split decision.

Loughnane faced Paata Tsxapelia on November 25, 2017 at ACB 75: Gadzhidaudov vs. Zieliński, winning the bout via head kick knockout in the third round.

After picking up a win over Amaury Junion at Celtic Gladiator 22, stopping him with leg kicks in the second round, he was invited to Dana White's Contender Series 17, where despite beating Bill Algeo via unanimous decision, he was not given a contract due to Dana White being upset that he went for a takedown in the last minute of a bout he was dominating.

Professional Fighters League 

Loughnane made his PFL debut against Matt Wagy on October 7, 2019 at PFL 7 , winning the bout via unanimous decision.

In his sophomore performance, Loughnane would face David Valente on December 31, 2019 at PFL 10, picking up his second straight unanimous decision victory under the PFL banner.

2021 Season 
Loughnane faced Sheymon Moraes on April 23, 2021 at PFL 1. He won the bout via KO in the first round, picking up his first stoppage victory in PFL.

Returning at PFL 4 on June 10, 2021, Loughnane had a hard-fought close bout with Tyler Diamond, winning the bout via majority decision and securing a spot in the PFL playoffs.

In the semi-finals of the 2021 Featherweight tournament, Loughnane faced Movlid Khaybulaev at PFL 9 on August 27, 2021, losing a close bout via split decision.

2022 Season 
Returning for another season, Loughnane faced Ryoji Kudo on February 21, 2022 at PFL 2, winning the bout via technical unanimous decision after an accidental clash of heads opened a cut on Kudo and rendered him unable to continue.

Loughnane was initially scheduled to face Boston Salmon on June 24, 2022 at PFL 5, however Salmon was forced to pull out due to unknown reasons and was replaced by Ago Huskić. He won the bout via unanimous decision and secured a spot in the playoffs for the second year running.

Loughnane faced Chris Wade in the Semifinals of the Featherweight tournament on August 20, 2022 at PFL 9. He won the bout via unanimous decision to advance to the final.

Loughnane faced Bubba Jenkins in the finals of the Featherweight tournament on November 25, 2022 at PFL 10. He won the bout via TKO stoppage in the fourth round to win the $1 million collective tournament pool.

2023 Season 
Loughnane will start of the 2023 season against Marlon Moraes on April 1, 2023 at PFL 1.

Championships and accomplishments

Mixed martial arts 
Professional Fighters League
2022 PFL Featherweight Championship
Full Contact Contender
 FCC Lightweight Championship (One time)
 Three successful title defenses
 Celtic Gladiator
 Interim CG Featherweight Championship

Mixed martial arts record

|-
|Win
|align=center|26–4
|Bubba Jenkins
|TKO (punches)
|PFL 10
|
|align=center|4
|align=center|2:38
|New York City, New York, United States
|
|-
|Win
|align=center|25–4
|Chris Wade
|Decision (unanimous)
|PFL 9
|
|align=center|3
|align=center|5:00
|London, England
|
|-
|Win
|align=center|24–4
|Ago Huskić
|Decision (unanimous)
|PFL 5 
| 
|align=center|3
|align=center|5:00
|Atlanta, Georgia, United States
|
|-
|Win
|align=center|23–4
|Ryoji Kudo
|Technical Decision (unanimous)
|PFL 2 
| 
|align=center|3
|align=center|3:00
|Arlington, Texas, United States
|
|-
|Loss
|align=center|22–4
|Movlid Khaybulaev
|Decision (split)
|PFL 9 
| 
|align=center|3
|align=center|5:00
|Hollywood, Florida, United States
|
|-
|Win
|align=center|22–3
|Tyler Diamond
|Decision (majority)
|PFL 4 
| 
|align=center|3
|align=center|5:00
|Atlantic City, New Jersey, United States
|
|-
|Win
|align=center|21–3
|Sheymon Moraes
|KO (punches)
|PFL 1 
|
|align=center|1
|align=center|2:55
|Atlantic City, New Jersey, United States
|
|-
|Win
|align=center|20–3
|David Valente
|Decision (unanimous)
|PFL 10 
| 
|align=center|3
|align=center|5:00
|New York City, New York, United States
|
|-
|Win
|align=center|19–3
|Matt Wagy
|Decision (unanimous)
|PFL 7 
| 
|align=center|3
|align=center|5:00
|Las Vegas, Nevada, United States
|
|-
|Win
|align=center|18–3
|Bill Algeo
|Decision (unanimous)
|Dana White's Contender Series 17
|
|align=center|3
|align=center|5:00
|Las Vegas, Nevada, United States
|
|-
|Win
|align=center|17–3
|Amaury Junior
|KO (leg kicks)
|Celtic Gladiator 22
| 
|align=center|2
|align=center|0:44
|Manchester, England
|
|-
|Win
|align=center|16–3
|Paata Tsxapelia
|KO (head kick)
|ACB 75: Gadzhidaudov vs. Zieliński
|
|align=center|3
|align=center|3:40
|Stuttgart, Germany
|
|-
|Loss
|align=center|15–3
|Pat Healy
|Decision (split)
|ACB 65: Silva vs. Agnaev
|
|align=center| 3
|align=center| 5:00
|Sheffield, England
|
|-
|Win
|align=center|15–2
|Mike Wilkinson
|KO (knee)
|ACB 54: Supersonic
|
|align=center|1
|align=center|2:30
|Manchester, England
|
|-
|Win
|align=center|14–2
|Paul Cook
|TKO (punches)
|Tankō FC 2
| 
|align=center|3
|align=center|3:16
|Manchester, England
|
|-
|Win
|align=center|13–2
|Eden Newton
|TKO (elbows)
|Tankō FC 1
| 
|align=center|2
|align=center|4:07
|Manchester, England
|
|-
|Win
|align=center|12–2
|David Lee
|KO (punches)
|Full Contact Contender 15
| 
|align=center|1
|align=center|1:31
|Bolton, England
|
|-
|Loss
|align=center|11–2
|Tom Duquesnoy
|Decision (split)
|BAMMA 22
|
|align=center| 3
|align=center| 5:00
|Dublin, Ireland
| 
|-
|Win
|align=center|11–1
|Steve Polifonte
|Decision (unanimous)
|BAMMA 19
| 
|align=center|3
|align=center|5:00
|Blackpool, England
|
|-
|Win
|align=center|10–1
|Florian Rousseau
|TKO (punches)
|BAMMA 17
| 
|align=center|1
|align=center|4:48
|Manchester, England
|
|-
|Win
|align=center|9–1
|Ali Maclean
|TKO (punches)
|Full Contact Contender 11
| 
|align=center|2
|align=center|0:55
|Bolton, England
|
|-
|Win
|align=center|8–1
|Jason Cooledge
|Decision (unanimous)
|Full Contact Contender 9
| 
|align=center|3
|align=center|5:00
|Bolton, England
|
|-
|Win
|align=center|7–1
|Tim Close
|Decision (unanimous)
|Full Contact Contender 7
| 
|align=center|3
|align=center|5:00
|Bolton, England
|
|-
|Loss
|align=center|6–1
|Mike Wilkinson
|Decision (unanimous)
|UFC on FX: Sotiropoulos vs. Pearson
|
|align=center|3
|align=center|5:00
|Gold Coast, Australia
|
|-
|Win
|align=center|6–0
|Danny Welsh
|Submission (rear-naked choke)
|UCC 11
| 
|align=center|1
|align=center|1:36
|Manchester, England
|
|-
|Win
|align=center|5–0
|Jordan Miller
|Decision (unanimous)
|UFA 1
| 
|align=center|3
|align=center|5:00
|Knutsford, England
|
|-
|Win
|align=center|4–0
|Dave Straughton
|TKO (submission to punches)
|Cage Conflict 8
| 
|align=center|1
|align=center|0:51
|Blackburn, England
|
|-
|Win
|align=center|3–0
|Shaun Law
|TKO (corner stoppage)
|UCC 3 
| 
|align=center|1
|align=center|1:01
|Blackpool, England
|
|-
|Win
|align=center|2–0
|Manos Skoulas
|TKO (punches)
|Greece Regional Show
| 
|align=center|1
|align=center|N/A
|Malia, Greece
|
|-
|Win
|align=center|1–0
|Jordan Desborough
|TKO (punches)
|X-Treme Kombat 2
| 
|align=center|2
|align=center|1:18
|Ulverston, England
|

See also
 List of current PFL fighters
 List of male mixed martial artists

References

External links
 

Living people
1989 births
English male mixed martial artists
Featherweight mixed martial artists
PFL male fighters